The Maritsa Iztok Complex is the largest energy complex in South Eastern Europe. It is located in Stara Zagora Province, south-central Bulgaria. It consists of three lignite-fired thermal power stations. The complex is located in a large lignite coal basin, which includes several mines, enrichment plants, a briquette plant and its own railway system.  The development of the thermal power and mining complex at Maritsa Iztok began in 1952, but the lignite deposits used to be known well in the mid-19th century. The Maritsa Iztok mines and power plants are interdependent as the only market for coal is the power plants, while the power plants have no other supplier of coal but the mines.

The complex is the largest source of  emissions in Bulgaria with 142,913,573 tons emitted in 2020.

Maritsa Iztok-1 (TPS AES Galabovo)
Maritsa Iztok-1 is located near Galabovo. In October 1998, the old power plant with a capacity of 500 megawatts (MW) was privatized and sold to Consolidated Continental Commerce (3C), later purchased by AES Corporation. On 15 February 2000, AES and the Bulgarian grid operator Natzionalna Elektricheska Kompania EAD (NEK) signed a 15-year tolling agreement, according to which AES has an obligation to replace the old power station with a new facility. In June 2006, AES started construction of the new 670 MW power station. It became operational on 3 June 2011. The new power station consists of two pulverised coal boilers of 335 MW each, two steam turbines, two generators and desulphurisation facilities. The plant was constructed by Alstom. It cost €1.2 billion.

Maritsa Iztok-2
Maritsa Iztok-2 is the largest thermal power plant in the Balkans. The construction of Maritsa Iztok-2 started on 7 May 1962; it was inaugurated on 10 November 1966. Maritsa Iztok-2 has a total installed capacity of 1,465 MW and generates 30%  of Bulgaria's electricity. It consists of eight generating units, two of which are equipped with flue gas desulphurization plants. The rehabilitation of the older power units, including construction of FGD plants for units 1 to 6, are in progress.

Maritsa Iztok-2 is wholly state-owned. It is a subsidiary of Bulgarian Energy Holding EAD.

In November 2014 the power station was ranked as the industrial facility that is causing the highest damage costs to health and the environment in Bulgaria and the entire European Union by the European Environment Agency.

In June 2019 a fire thought to be caused by routine maintenance broke out on the smokestack of the flue gas desulphurisation system at Unit 8.

Maritsa Iztok-3
Maritsa Iztok-3 is Bulgaria's third-largest power plant. The power plant has an installed capacity of 900 MW, which is produced by four units of each 225 MW.

In 1998, the United States power utility Entergy Corporation purchased 73% of Maritsa Iztok-3 shares for US$375 million from the Bulgarian state. Entergy also has the obligation to modernize the power station. In 2002, the Italian power company Enel joined the project; in 2006 Enel acquired Entergy's stake. At present, Maritsa Iztok-3 is owned and operated by Energiina Kompaniya Maritsa Iztok 3 AD, a joint venture of ContourGlobal (73%) and NEK (27%).

Enel is planning to invest in a new 700-800 MW coal-fired power plant next to the existing Maritsa Iztok-3 plant. The new power plant is expected to cost €900 million.

New power station

The Bulgarian power regulator is expected to open a competitive procedure for the construction of a new 700 MW plant in the Maritsa Iztok basin. In addition to Enel's new power station project, the construction of a new power station is proposed by the German utility RWE. RWE and the Maritsa Iztok mining complex have signed an agreement on setting up a joint company that will apply for construction of the power station. RWE expects the investment to be €900 million to €1 billion, and the power station to be ready by 2013.

See also

 Energy in Bulgaria

References

External links
 Maritsa Iztok 2 power station (Bulgarian)
  Maritsa Iztok 3 ENEL power station

Buildings and structures in Stara Zagora Province
Chimneys in Bulgaria
Coal-fired power stations in Bulgaria
Energy infrastructure completed in 1966
Energy infrastructure completed in 1980
Energy infrastructure completed in 2011
Open-pit mines